Moskalenko is a Ukrainian surname. Notable people with the name include:

 Alexander Moskalenko (born 1969), Russian trampolinist
 Anastasiia Moskalenko (born 2000), Ukrainian Paralympian
 Karinna Moskalenko (born 1954), Russian human rights lawyer
 Kirill Moskalenko (1902–1985), Marshal of the Soviet Union
 Larisa Moskalenko (born 1963), Soviet-Ukrainian sailor
 Nikolay Moskalenko (born 1990), Russian football goalkeeper
 Vitaliy Moskalenko (born 1974), Russian triple jumper
 Yaroslav Moskalenko (born 1975), Ukrainian politician

See also
 

Ukrainian-language surnames
Surnames of Ukrainian origin